Gorz Kol (also Romanized as Gorz Gol) is a village in Beyranvand-e Jonubi Rural District, Bayravand District, Khorramabad County, Lorestan Province, Iran. At the 2006 census, its population was 33, in 9 families.

References 

Towns and villages in Khorramabad County